The 2005 Sylvania 300 was the twenty-seventh stock car race of the 2005 NASCAR Nextel Cup Series and the first in the ten-race season-ending Chase for the Nextel Cup. It was held on September 18, 2005 at New Hampshire Motor Speedway in Loudon, New Hampshire. The 300-lap race was won by Ryan Newman of the Penske-Jasper Racing team. Tony Stewart finished second and Matt Kenseth came in third.

Background

New Hampshire Motor Speedway is one of ten intermediate tracks that hold NASCAR races. Its banking in the turns varies from two to seven degrees, while the front stretch, the finish line, and the back stretch are all banked at one degree.

Before the race, Tony Stewart led the Drivers' Championship with 5,050 points, followed by Greg Biffle with 5,045. Jimmie Johnson was fourth with 5,035 points and Kurt Busch in fifth had 5,030 points. Mark Martin was sixth with 5,025 points with Jeremy Mayfield seventh on 5,020 points. Matt Kenseth was tied with Carl Edwards on 5,015 points and Ryan Newman on 5,005 points rounded out the top ten. In the Manufacturers' Championship,

Busch was the race's defending champion.

Entry list

Practice and qualifying
Two practice sessions were held on Friday before the Sunday race—both of which lasted 60 minutes. During the first practice session, Gordon was fastest, placing ahead of Stewart in second and Robby Gordon in third. Newman was scored fourth, and Bobby Labonte placed fifth. Jamie McMurray, Kenseth, Dale Earnhardt Jr., Jeff Green and Casey Mears rounded out the top ten fastest drivers in the session. Later that day, Rusty Wallace set the second session's fastest time, ahead of Kyle Busch, brother Kurt Busch and Kasey Kahne in second, third and fourth respectively. Stewart was fifth, while the rest of the top ten consisted of Travis Kvapil, J. J. Yeley, Newman, Martin and Jeff Burton.

Although forty-nine cars attempted to qualify; according to NASCAR's qualifying procedure, only forty-three could race.

Qualifying results

Race recap 

Tempers flared during the race day with the tone of the afternoon was set early when Scott Riggs tangled with playoff driver Kurt Busch on lap 3. Busch was sent to the garage for repairs and fell 66 laps down. Busch stormed Riggs' pit box, and had words with crew chief, Rodney Childers. On lap 166, Kyle Busch tangled with Kasey Kahne, who was sent hard into the wall. During the caution, Kahne maneuvered his wrecked car in front of Kyle Busch. On lap 191, Michael Waltrip and Robby Gordon crashed. The next time by, Gordon attempted ram Waltrip's car with his wrecked machine, then threw his helmet at Waltrip's car. Ryan Newman eventually won the race by leading a total of 66 out of the 300 laps. Pole sitter Tony Stewart led 173 before getting passed by Newman on lap 298 of 300. This victory for Newman would jump him up in the Chase standings from 10th to 3rd with just 9 races to go with him finishing 6th at the end of the season.

Race results

Post-race

NASCAR issued the following penalties following the race:

 Kasey Kahne was $25,000 and docked him 25 points and was placed on probation for the remainder of the season for the deliberate collision against Kyle Busch.
 Robby Gordon was fined a total of $35,000, docked 50 points and was also placed on probation for the balance of the season for calling Waltrip a "piece of shit" on the post-race live interview on TNT and for throwing his helmet at Waltrip's car; the 50-point penalty covered both charges at 25 points each. Waltrip was also fined $10,000 and docked 25 points for using what seemed to be an obscene gesture, but after review of video on appeal, there was no obscene gesture and the penalty was overturned.
 Brian Vickers was fined $15,000 and docked 25 points for failing post-race inspection, unrelated to incidents above.

Standings after the race

References

Sylvania 300
Sylvania 300
NASCAR races at New Hampshire Motor Speedway